Duke Jian of Qin (428–400 BC) was, from 414 to 400 BC, the 26th ruler of the Zhou Dynasty Chinese state of Qin that eventually united China to become the Qin Dynasty.  His ancestral name was Ying (嬴), and Duke Jian was his posthumous title.

Duke Jian was the younger son of Duke Huai of Qin and the uncle of his predecessor Duke Ling. When Duke Ling died in 415 BC, the throne was passed to Duke Jian instead of Duke Ling's son, the later Duke Xian.

During Duke Jian's reign Qin was defeated several times by the State of Wei, then a major power of the Warring States period.

Duke Jian reigned for 15 years and died in 400 BC, aged 28.  He was succeeded by his son, Duke Hui II of Qin.

References

Rulers of Qin
5th-century BC Chinese monarchs
428 BC births
400 BC deaths